Shivaskanda Satakarni was one of the last rulers of the Satavahana dynasty in India. He succeeded Vashishtiputra Satakarni in 145 CE. His reign is dated variously: 154-161 CE, or 145-152 CE.

He was defeated twice in battle by his Western Satrap enemy Rudradaman.

Notes

2nd-century Indian monarchs
Year of death unknown
Satavahana dynasty
Year of birth unknown